HMS Pigeon was the mercantile Fanny which the Admiralty purchased on 28 May 1805 for use as a despatch cutter. She was wrecked, though without loss of life, in November.

Service
After her purchase, Pigeon was fitted for foreign service at Deptford between 25 May and 10 August. She was commissioned in May under Lieutenant John Luckraft.

Fate
Pigeon was wrecked off the Texel on 30 November while carrying despatches for Lieutenant General George Don at Bremerlehe. Her crew was saved, but became prisoners of the Dutch. Luckraft was freed the next year.

The court martial on 20 February 1806 found that it was pilot Robert Barron's inexperience that caused the wreck; he was severely reprimanded and lost all pay. However, the court saved its greatest criticism for Luckraft. It deemed his actions before and after the wreck to be so incompetent that it constituted criminal negligence. He was so drunk at the time of the wreck that his orders were incoherent. The court ordered him dismissed the service and to be imprisoned in the Marshalsea or two months.

Notes, citations, and references
Notes

Citations

References
 
 
O'Byrne, William R. (1849) A Naval Biographical Dictionary: comprising the life and services of every living officer in Her Majesty's navy, from the rank of admiral of the fleet to that of lieutenant, inclusive. (London: J. Murray).
 

 

1800s ships
Maritime incidents in 1805
Schooners of the Royal Navy
Shipwrecks of the Netherlands
Shipwrecks in the North Sea